Waplewo may refer to the following places in Poland:
Waplewo, Olsztyn County
Waplewo, Szczytno County
Waplewo Wielkie, Sztum County